Fortt is a surname. Notable people with the surname include: 

Jon Fortt (born 1976), American journalist
Khairi Fortt (born 1992), American football player and actor

See also
Fort (surname)